Bloc for Asturias (BA) is a left-wing Asturian nationalist political party in Spain, based in the Principality of Asturias. In 2012 it joined with Asturian Nationalist Unity into the Commitment for Asturias.

It was part of the now-inactive Open Assembly for Officialisation, an organization whose objective was to make Asturian an official language of Spain. Its general secretary is Roberto Colunga and its spokesperson is Rafael Palacios.

References

Left-wing nationalist parties
Political parties in Asturias
Political parties established in 2003